Na tinombur is a typical Batak dish from Tapanuli, North Sumatra, Indonesia. 

Dishes that use catfish or fish is processed mujahir burned and served with chili sauce, similar to lele penyet atau pecel lele.

Carp or other fish can, which is important tomburnya is smeared condiments and sauces to fish.

See also

 Saksang
 Sasagun

References 
 Ikan Lele Natinombur
 Travel Kompas - Natinombur

Batak cuisine